Andrey Rublev defeated Novak Djokovic in the final, 6–2, 6–7(4–7), 6–0 to win the singles tennis title at the 2022 Serbia Open.

Matteo Berrettini was the defending champion, but chose not to defend his title.

Seeds
The top four seeds received a bye into the second round.

Draw

Finals

Top half

Bottom half

Qualifying

Seeds

Qualifiers

Draw

First qualifier

Second qualifier

Third qualifier

Fourth qualifier

References

External links
Main draw
Qualifying draw

Serbia Open - Singles